Ajay Kumar Mittal (born 30 September 1958) is an Indian Judge. He is former Chief Justice of Madhya Pradesh High Court and Meghalaya High Court and also former Judge of Punjab and Haryana High Court.

Career
He passed B.Com. (Hons.) from Shri Ram College of Commerce, University of Delhi in 1977 and completed his LL.B. from Faculty of Law, University of Delhi in 1980. In the same year he enrolled as an Advocate with the Bar Council of Punjab and Haryana and started practice in the Punjab and Haryana High Court in July 1980. He was elevated as Judge of Punjab and Haryana High Court on 9 January 2004. He served as the Acting Chief Justice of Punjab and Haryana High Court from 4 May 2018 to 2 June 2018. He was soon appointed as the Chief Justice of Meghalaya High Court and took oath on 28 May 2019. He was transferred as the Chief Justice of Madhya Pradesh High Court for his final year, and he took oath on 3 November 2019. He retired on 29 September 2020.

References

Living people
1958 births